Denis Yevgenyevich Yakuba (born 26 May 1996) is a Russian football player. He plays as a defensive midfielder for PFC Krylia Sovetov Samara.

Club career
He was first moved to the senior squad of FC Kuban Krasnodar in March 2014. He made his debut for Kuban on 23 September 2015 in a Russian Cup game against FC Shinnik Yaroslavl. He started in the next Russian Cup round game against FC Spartak Moscow on 28 October 2015, which his team won 1–0 to advance to the quarterfinals. He made his Russian Premier League debut on 1 November 2015 against FC Lokomotiv Moscow.

On 9 July 2019, Russian Premier League club PFC Krylia Sovetov Samara confirmed that Yakuba will join the squad for the 2019–20 season.

International
He won the 2013 UEFA European Under-17 Championship with Russia national under-17 football team, with which he also participated in the 2013 FIFA U-17 World Cup.

Later he represented Russia national under-19 football team at the 2015 UEFA European Under-19 Championship, where Russia came in second place and he was selected for the team of the tournament.

Career statistics

References

External links
 
 

1996 births
Sportspeople from Stavropol Krai
People from Stavropol Krai
Living people
Russian footballers
Association football midfielders
Russia youth international footballers
Russia under-21 international footballers
FC Kuban Krasnodar players
FC Rotor Volgograd players
PFC Krylia Sovetov Samara players
Russian Premier League players
Russian First League players
Russian Second League players